Axixá do Tocantins is a municipality located in the Brazilian state of Tocantins. Its population in 2020 was 9,787 and its area is 150 km2. It is the smallest municipality in that state by area.

References

Populated places established in 1964
Municipalities in Tocantins